The AIDA model is just one of a class of models known as hierarchy of effects models or hierarchical models, all of which imply that consumers move through a series of steps or stages when they make purchase decisions. These models are linear, sequential models built on an assumption that consumers move through a series of cognitive (thinking) and affective (feeling) stages culminating in a behavioural (doing e.g. purchase or trial) stage.

Steps proposed by the AIDA model 
The steps proposed by the AIDA model are as follows:

 Attention – The consumer becomes aware of a category, product or brand (usually through advertising)
↓
 Interest  – The consumer becomes interested by learning about brand benefits & how the brand fits with lifestyle
↓
 Desire  –  The consumer develops a favorable disposition towards the brand
↓
 Action – The consumer forms a purchase intention, shops around, engages in trial or makes a purchase

Some of the contemporary variants of the model replace attention with awareness. The common thread among all hierarchical models is that advertising operates as a stimulus (S) and the purchase decision is a response (R). In other words, the AIDA model is an applied stimulus-response model.  A number of hierarchical models can be found in the literature including Lavidge's hierarchy of effects, DAGMAR and variants of AIDA. Hierarchical models have dominated advertising theory, and, of these models, the AIDA model is one of the most widely applied.
                                                                                                        
As consumers move through the hierarchy of effects they pass through both a cognitive processing stage and an affective processing stage before any action occurs. Thus the hierarchy of effects models all include Cognition (C)- Affect (A)- Behaviour (B) as the core steps in the underlying behavioral sequence. Some texts refer to this sequence as Learning → Feeling → Doing or C-A-B (cognitive -affective-behavioral) models.

 Cognition (Awareness/learning) → Affect (Feeling/ interest/ desire) → Behavior (Action e.g. purchase/ trial/ consumption/ usage/ sharing information)

The basic AIDA model is one of the longest serving hierarchical models, having been in use for more than a century. Using a hierarchical system, such as AIDA, provides the marketer with a detailed understanding of how target audiences change over time, and provides insights as to which types of advertising messages are likely to be more effective at different junctures. Moving from step to step, the total number of prospects diminishes. This phenomenon is sometimes described as a "purchase funnel".  A relatively large number of  potential purchasers become aware of a product or brand, then a smaller subset becomes interested, with only a relatively small proportion moving through to the actual purchase. This effect is also known as a  "customer funnel", "marketing funnel", or "sales funnel".

The model is also used extensively in selling and advertising. According to the original model, "the steps to be taken by the seller at each stage are as follows:
		
 Stage I. Secure attention. 
	
 Stage II. Hold attention Through Interest. 
 	
 Stage III. Arouse Desire.

 Stage IV. Create Confidence and Belief.

 Stage V. Secure Decision and Action.

 Stage VI. Create Satisfaction."

Criticisms
A major deficiency of the AIDA model and other hierarchical models is the absence of post-purchase effects such as satisfaction, consumption, repeat patronage behaviour and other post-purchase behavioural intentions such as referrals or participating in the preparation of online product reviews.  Other criticisms include the model's reliance on a linear nature, hierarchical sequence. In empirical studies, the model has been found to be a poor predictor of actual consumer behaviour. In addition, an extensive review of the literature surrounding advertising effects, carried out by Vakratsas and Ambler found little empirical support for the hierarchical models. 

Another important criticism of the hierarchical models include their reliance on the concept of a linear, hierarchical response process. Indeed, some research suggests that consumers process promotional information via dual pathways, namely both cognitive (thinking) and affective (feeling) simultaneously. This insight has led to the development of a class of alternative models, known as integrative models.

Variants 

In order to redress some of the model's deficiencies, a number of contemporary hierarchical models have modified or expanded the basic AIDA model. Some of these include post purchase stages, while other variants feature adaptations designed to accommodate the role of new, digital and interactive media, including social media and brand communities. However, all follow the basic sequence which includes Cognition- Affect- Behaviour.

Selected variants of AIDA:

 Basic AIDA Model: Awareness → Interest → Desire → Action
 Lavidge et al's Hierarchy of Effects: Awareness → Knowledge → Liking → Preference → Conviction → Purchase
 McGuire's model: Presentation → Attention → Comprehension → Yielding → Retention → Behavior.
 Modified AIDA Model: Awareness → Interest → Conviction → Desire → Action (purchase or consumption)
 AIDAS Model: Attention → Interest → Desire → Action → Satisfaction
 AISDALSLove model: Awareness → Interest → Search → Desire → Action → Like/dislike → Share → Love/Hate

Origins
The term, AIDA and the overall approach are commonly attributed to American advertising and sales pioneer, E. St. Elmo Lewis. In one of his publications on advertising, Lewis postulated at least three principles to which an advertisement should conform:

 According to F. G. Coolsen, "Lewis developed his discussion of copy principles on the formula that good copy should attract attention, awaken interest, and create conviction." In fact, the formula with three steps appeared anonymously in the February 9, 1898, issue of Printers' Ink: "The mission of an advertisement is to sell goods. To do this, it must attract attention, of course; but attracting attention is only an auxiliary detail. The announcement should contain matter which will interest and convince after the attention has been attracted" (p. 50).

On January 6, 1910 Lewis gave a talk in Rochester on the topic "Is there a science back of advertising?" in which he said:

The importance of attracting the attention of the reader as the first step in copy writing was recognized early in the advertising literature as is shown by the Handbook for Advertisers and Guide to Advertising:

A precursor to Lewis was Joseph Addison Richards (1859–1928), an advertising agent from New York City who succeeded his father in the direction of one of the oldest advertising agencies in the United States. In 1893, Richards wrote an advertisement for his business containing virtually all steps from the AIDA model, but without hierarchically ordering the individual elements:

Between December 1899 and February 1900, the Bissell Carpet Sweeper Company organized a contest for the best written advertisement. Fred Macey, chairman of the Fred Macey Co. in Grand Rapids (Michigan), who was considered an advertising expert at that time, was assigned the task to examine the submissions to the company. In arriving at a decision, he considered inter alia each advertisement in the following respect:

The first published instance of the general concept, however, was in an article by Frank Hutchinson Dukesmith (1866–1935) in 1904. Dukesmith's four steps were attention, interest, desire, and conviction. The first instance of the AIDA acronym was in an article by C. P. Russell in 1921 where he wrote:

The model's usefulness was not confined solely to advertising. The basic principles of the AIDA model were widely adopted by sales representatives who used the steps to prepare effective sales presentations following the publication, in 1911, of Arthur Sheldon's book, Successful Selling. To the original model, Sheldon added satisfaction to stress the importance of repeat patronage.

AIDA is a linchpin of the Promotional part of the 4Ps of the Marketing mix, the mix itself being a key component of the model connecting customer needs through the organisation to the marketing decisions.

Theoretical developments in hierarchy of effects models

The marketing and advertising literature has spawned a number of hierarchical models. In a survey of more than 250 papers, Vakratsas and Ambler (1999) found little empirical support for any of the hierarchies of effects. In spite of that criticism, some authors have argued that hierarchical models continue to dominate theory, especially in the area of marketing communications and advertising.

All hierarchy of effects models exhibit several common characteristics. Firstly, they are all linear, sequential models built on an assumption that consumers move through a series of steps or stages involving cognitive, affective and behavioral responses that culminate in a purchase. Secondly, all hierarchy of effects models can be reduced to three broad stages - Cognitive→ Affective (emotions)→Behavioral (CAB).

Three broad stages implicit in all hierarchy of effects models:

 Cognition (Awareness or learning)
↓
 Affect (Feeling, interest or desire)
↓
 Behavior (Action)

Recent modifications of the AIDA model have expanded the number of steps. Some of these modifications have been designed to accommodate theoretical developments, by including customer satisfaction (e.g. the AIDAS model) while other alternative models seek to accommodate changes in the external environment such as the rise of social media (e.g. the AISDALSLove model).

In the AISDALSLove model, new phases are 'Search' (after Interest), the phase when consumers actively searching information about brand/ product, 'Like/dislike' (after Action) as one of elements in the post-purchase phase, then continued with 'Share' (consumers will share their experiences about brand to other consumers) and the last is 'Love/hate' (a deep feeling towards branded product, that can become the long-term effect of advertising) which new elements such as Search, Like/dislike (evaluation), Share and Love/hate as long-term effects have also been added. Finally, S – 'Satisfaction' – is added to suggest the likelihood that a customer might become a repeat customer, provide positive referrals or engage in other brand advocacy behaviors following purchase.

Other theorists, including Christian Betancur (2014) and Rossiter and Percy (1985) have proposed that need recognition should be included as the initial stage of any hierarchical model. Betancur, for example, has proposed a more complete process: NAITDASE model (in Spanish: NAICDASE). Betancur's model begins with the identification of a Need (the consumer's perception of an opportunity or a problem). Following the Attention and Interest stages, consumers form feelings of Trust (i.e., Confidence). Without trust, customers are unlikely to move forward towards the Desire and Action stages of the process. Purchase is not the end stage in this model, as this is not the goal of the client; therefore, the final two stages are the Satisfaction of previously identified and agreed needs and the Evaluation by the customer about the whole process. If positive, it will repurchase and recommend to others (Customer's loyalty).

In Betancur's model, trust is a key element in the purchase process, and must be achieved through important elements including:
 
 Business and personal image (including superior brand support). 
 Empathy with this customer. 
 Professionalism (knowledge of the product and master of the whole process from the point of view of the customer).
 Ethics without exceptions.
 Competitive Superiority (to solve the needs and requirements of this customer).
 Commitment during the process and toward the customer satisfaction.
Trust (or Confidence) is the glue that bonds society and makes solid and reliable relations of each one other.

Cultural references
In the film Glengarry Glen Ross by David Mamet, the character Blake (played by Alec Baldwin) makes a speech where the AIDA model is visible on a chalkboard in the scene. A minor difference between the fictional account of the model and the model as it is commonly used is that the "A" in Blake's motivational talk is defined as attention rather than awareness and the "D" as decision rather than desire.

See also

Advertising models

Notes

References

Geml, Richard and Lauer, Hermann: Marketing- und Verkaufslexikon, 4. Auflage, Stuttgart 2008, 

Marketing techniques
Selling techniques
Promotion and marketing communications